Grazalema is a village located in the northeastern part of the province of Cádiz, in the autonomous community of Andalusia, Spain.  Situated in the foothills of the Sierra del Pinar mountain range (Sierra de Grazalema Natural Park), Grazalema had, as of 2009, a population of 2,205.

History
The Roman villa of Lacidulia or Lacidulerium, situated in an estate near to the present village, has been traditionally considered the ancestor of Grazalema.

During Muslim rule in the 8th century, these lands were populated by people of Arab origin and from them, the area acquired the name of Raisa lami Suli, "town of the Banu al-Salim" a tribe originated in the hijaz Arabia , place which passed to Ben-salama, "Son of Zulema and later Grand Zulema". During this period, its economy was organised around forestry, agriculture, farming and textile manufacture.

With the Christian conquest in 1485, Zagrazalema, as it was called at the time, became part of the lands of the Rodrigo Ponce de León y Núñez. It became economically important as of the 17th century thanks to the drapery industry which produced the famous shawls of Grazalema. In the first years of the 19th century, during the War of Independence, Grazalema suffered attacks and sieges from the Napoleonic troops who partially destroyed the village.

See also
Sierra de Grazalema Natural Park
Grazalema blanket

References

External links

Grazalema Guide Information about Grazalema
Grazalema Andalusian statistical information system

Municipalities of the Province of Cádiz